Succasunna is an unincorporated community and census-designated place (CDP) located within Roxbury Township, in Morris County, New Jersey, United States, serving as its downtown and population center, having a population of 9,152 people as of the 2010 United States Census.

History
The name of Succasunna comes from the Lenni-Lenape Native American word for "land of black stones", most likely due to the rich iron-ore deposits in the area. The community was established circa 1740.

The Morris Canal, although not in use today, was an important transportation link in the iron industry around Succasunna, carrying coal to iron-ore producing areas all over northern New Jersey.  The canal was abandoned in 1924 and largely dismantled.

Succasunna was the site of the world's first electronic switching public telephone exchange.  The Western Electric model 1ESS system was cut over for service on the New Jersey Bell 584 central office on May 30, 1965.  A commemorative plaque on the wall of the central office building notes this historic event.  Instead of electro-mechanical relays, the 1ESS was the first commercial computerized electronic switching system. This innovation allowed for features of modern telephone service, like call forwarding, call waiting, and three-way calling.

U.S. Route 46 and Route 10 pass through the area. The Morristown and Erie Railway runs rail freight service through the area 2-5 times per week on its High Bridge Branch.

Geography
According to the United States Census Bureau, the CDP had a total area of 5.187 square miles (13.435 km2), including 5.128 square miles (13.282 km2) of land and 0.059 square miles (0.153 km2) of water (1.14%).

Demographics

Succasunna was part of the Succasunna-Kenvil CDP in the 2000 United States Census, which counted the combined population of Succasunna and Kenvil as 12,569. For the 2010 Census, the area was split into two CDPs, Succasunna, with a population of 9,152, and Kenvil with 3,009 people.

Census 2010

Education
As part of Roxbury Township, residents of Succasunna are served by the Roxbury School District.

Established in 1963, St. Therese School is a Catholic school located in the community, operated under the auspices of the Roman Catholic Diocese of Paterson.

Notable people

People who were born in, residents of, or otherwise closely associated with Succasunna include:
 Harry "A" Chesler (born 1898), comic book entrepreneur, publisher and packager
 Philemon Dickerson (1788-1862), 12th Governor of New Jersey
 Leo Warren Jenkins (1913–1989), educator who served as the sixth president and chancellor of what is now East Carolina University
 Doug Miller (born 1969), soccer player and coach
 Paige Monaghan (born 1996), professional soccer player who currently plays for Sky Blue FC of the National Women's Soccer League

References

Census-designated places in Morris County, New Jersey
Roxbury Township, New Jersey